The 1986 WAFU Club Championship was the ninth football club tournament season that took place for the runners-up of each West African country's domestic league, the West African Club Championship. It was won again by Africa Sports after defeating Asante Kotoko from Ghana 6-5 in penalty shootouts as both clubs had two goals each in its two matches.  A total of 45 goals were scored. Originally a 22 match season, as Sierra Leone's Real Republicans and ASC Police from Nouakchott, Mauritania withdrew, Asante Kotoko and Université du Benin FC (or University of Benin FC) automatically qualify in the quarterfinals.

Not a single club from Mali, Niger and the Gambia participated.

Preliminary round
The matches took place from June 6 to 20.  Africa Sports and Stade d'Abidjan directly qualified to the semis.

|}

Quarterfinals
The matches took place from August 3 to 17.

|}

Semifinals
The matches took place from November 9 and 16.

|}

Finals
The matches took place on December 14 and 28.

|}

Winners

See also
1986 African Cup of Champions Clubs
1986 CAF Cup Winners' Cup

Notes

References

External links
Full results of the 1986 WAFU Club Championship at RSSSF

West African Club Championship
1986 in African football